Sunning may refer to:

 Sunning, Berkshire, United Kingdom
 The former name of Taishan, Guangdong, China
 Sunning (behaviour)

See also
 Suning (disambiguation)
 Sunning Plaza and Sunning Court, former building complex in Hong Kong